Rock pools, or tide pools, are rocky pools on the sea shore filled with seawater.

Rock pool, Rock-pool, or Rockpool may also refer to:
SS Rockpool (1927), a British cargo ship shipwrecked in February 1941
Rock-pool blenny (Parablennius parvicornis), a species of fish
Hypsoblennius gilberti (also known as rockpool blenny), a species of fish
Rockpool, a restaurant in Sydney, and Rockpool Bar & Grill, a factory-job steakhouse in Melbourne, both founded by Neil Perry
Rockpool Games, a mobile phone games studio founded by Paul Gouge
"Rockpool", an episode of the television series Teletubbies
Rock Pool (Newcastle), an open air sea pool in Newcastle, Northern Ireland
 The Rock Pool, a 1936 novel by Cyril Connolly